Pontus Ekhem (born June 19, 1991) is a Swedish ice hockey player, also known as 'Ponty' and also coined the phrase "It's Ponty!". He is 169 cm tall
 
He started his career at Skåre BK in 2001 and was drafted to Nor IK for the 2002–2003 season. He made a comeback to Skåre BK for the 2004–2005 season

After the 2005–2006 season he moved to The Netherlands where he joined the Hijs Hokij Wolves Under 17 team and they won  the 2007 Dutch championship.

In the season 2007–2008 he moved to Den Bosch Red Eagles Under 17 team  and finished third in the championships after several years without any Under 17 team. With the Red Eagles team, he has had big successes in Belgium and The Netherlands.

During his time in The Netherlands he has played in two different allstar teams, Dutch Alligators and the Pirates.

During the season 2010/2011 he joined the Regulators in Salt Lake City, UT, playing for the Rocky Mountain Renegades 18U.

Since the fall 2011 he is playing for Bradford Sabres in the British Universities Ice Hockey Association

References

External links
 Skating style

Swedish ice hockey forwards
Living people
1991 births